Agonum superioris is a species of ground beetle from the Platyninae subfamily that can be found in the United States.

References

Beetles described in 1966
superioris
Endemic fauna of the United States